Antingan (Atingän) is a rural locality (a selo) and the administrative centre of Antingansky Selsoviet, Khaybullinsky District, Bashkortostan, Russia. The population was 536 as of 2010. There are 14 streets.

Geography 
Antingan is located 26 km west of Akyar (the district's administrative centre) by road. Abubakirovo is the nearest rural locality.

References 

Rural localities in Khaybullinsky District